Trongisvágsfjørður is a fjord on the island of Suðuroy in the Faroe Islands. There are four villages around the fjord. Furthest east on the northern side of the fjord is Froðba, in the bottom of the fjord is Trongisvágur. In between Trongisvágur and Froðba is Tvøroyri, the largest of these villages. South of Trongisvágur in a bay is Øravík, a part of Øravík is called Øravíkarlíð, it is located close to Trongisvágur and not visible from Øravík. These villages are in the Municipality of Tvøroyri.

The ferry port on Krambatangi 
The ferry port of Krambatangi is on the southern side of the fjord between Trongisvágur and Øravík. The ferry port was on Drelnes before 2005 when the new ferry Smyril arrived, which necessitated building a new ferry port. Drelnes is just a few hundred metres further east than Krambatangi.

The Salt Silo on Drelnes 
There is an old Salt Silo on Drelnes which is a ruin, but there is a plan called Project Salt which intends to restore the Saltsilo into a concert hall and cultural house. There was a big concert there in May 2010. All the bands played for free in order to support the project.

References

External links 
 Tvoroyri.fo, about the Salt Silo.
 Tvoroyri.fo, Port of Tvoroyri.
 SSL.fo
 Photos on Flickr from the aid concert in the ruin Salt Silo on Drelnes in May 2010.

Fjords of the Faroe Islands
Suðuroy